Paddys River, a perennial stream that is part of the Murrumbidgee catchment within the Murray–Darling basin, is located in the Australian Capital Territory, Australia.

Location and features
Paddys River rises on the eastern slopes of the Brindabella Ranges in the south-west of the Australian Capital Territory (ACT), below Castle Hill in Tidbinbilla Nature Reserve, within Namadgi National Park and is formed by the confluence of Blue Gum Creek and Punchbowl Creek. The river, joined by Tidbinbilla River and Gibraltar Creek, flows generally north-west and to the west of the Canberra suburbs of Conder and Gordon, before reaching its confluence with Cotter River, near Mount Stromlo. The river descends  over its  course.

See also

References

 

Rivers of the Australian Capital Territory
Murray-Darling basin